Leo D. Maloney (January 4, 1888 – November 2, 1929) was an American film actor, director, producer, and screenwriter of the silent era.

Biography
Maloney was born in Santa Rosa, California, and built the "Leo Maloney Studio" in the San Bernardino Mountains of Southern California. He appeared in more than 150 films between 1911 and 1929. He also directed 47 films between 1914 and 1929. Maloney's final film was one of the first sound pictures, 1929's Overland Bound.  While at a party in Manhattan to celebrate the completion of that picture, Maloney suffered a fatal stroke.

Selected filmography

 Why the Sheriff Is a Bachelor (1914)
 The Telltale Knife (1914)
 The Hazards of Helen (1914)
 The Man from the East (1914)
 Lass of the Lumberlands (1916)
 The Spitfire of Seville (1919)
 The Fatal Sign (1920)
 The Big Catch (1920)
 A Gamblin' Fool (1920)
 The Grinning Granger (1920)
 One Law for All (1920)
 The Wolverine (1921)
 The Outlaw Express (1926)
 The Blind Trail (1926)
 The High Hand (1926)
 Two-Gun of the Tumbleweed (1927)
 Don Desperado (1927)
 The Man from Hard Pan (1927)
 The Long Loop on the Pecos (1927)
 Border Blackbirds (1927)
 Vultures of the Sea (1928)
 The Black Ace (1928)
 The Apache Raider (1928)
 The Vanishing West (1928)
 The Bronc Stomper (1928)
 Yellow Contraband (1928)
 The Boss of Rustler's Roost (1928)
 .45 Calibre War (1929)
 Overland Bound (1929)
 The Fire Detective (1929)

References

External links

1880s births
1929 deaths
American male film actors
American male silent film actors
Film producers from California
American male screenwriters
Male actors from Santa Rosa, California
Film directors from California
Burials at Hollywood Forever Cemetery
20th-century American male actors
Screenwriters from California
20th-century American male writers
20th-century American screenwriters